Vakkapatlavari Palem is a village in Nagayalanka mandal of Krishna district, Andhra Pradesh. It has been a gram panchayat since the 1960s.

References

Villages in Krishna district